Ally Cailin Green (born 17 August 1998) is a footballer who plays as a defender for Danish side AGF and the New Zealand national team.

Club career
Green signed for Sydney FC in Australia's top soccer league, W-League for the 2017-18 season but endured a severe ankle injury and did not play during the season. During the 2018–19 season, Green played in eight games for Sydney FC. The club finished in third place during the regular season and earned a berth to the finals series. Green was the starting left-back defender for the semi-final match against Brisbane Roar and helped Sydney win 2–1 and advance to the 2019 W-League Grand Final. She played every minute of the Final helping lift the team to a 4–2 championship win against Perth Glory.

During the 2019–20 W-League season, Green made ten appearances with eight starts. Sydney FC finished in third place earning a berth to the Finals. ESPN described Green's performance in the semi-final against Melbourne Victory: "Green showed the kind of grit that allowed Sydney to withstand a second-half Victory onslaught. She then headed into her third consecutive Grand Final with the club that gave her the first taste of professional football, and at just 23 years old, it's easy to see the potential for bigger and better things to come." During the 2020 W-League Grand Final, Green made a "brilliant cross-field ball" to Veronica Latsko. Sydney FC were narrowly defeated 1–0 by four-time champions Melbourne City FC.

The 2020-2021 W-League season was Green's most consistent yet. Starting all season games, making her impact game after game. Sydney FC were crowned Premiers after an outstanding season finishing top of the table. Green then produced a stunning 30-yard strike in the Semi-final against Canberra United, which saw her team progress to the Grand Final for a fourth consecutive year & additionally would earn a well deserved goal of the season award from her club. A hard-fought extra-time match saw Sydney FC narrowly go down 1–0 in the dying minute of the match. Nothing would take away from another solid performance from Green and an excellent display of courage to withstand the full 120 minutes running up & down as a fullback. She returns to Sydney FC for her fifth season with 'Sky Blue' for the 2021–22 season.

In January 2023, Green joined Danish club AGF.

International career
Green represented Australia for the under-20 national team at the 2016 AFF Women's Championship where she scored a hat-trick against Timor-Leste. Green also featured in the Senior Matilda's first Identification Camp in 2019 on the back on successful W-League & NPL campaigns.

On 25 March 2022 Green announced that she was committed to playing for New Zealand after constantly being overlooked for the Australian team. She is due to be called up for New Zealand in their upcoming friendlies against Australia in April, provided FIFA approve a one-time switch of nationality.

Personal life
Green grew up on Sydney's Northern Beaches, where she attended primary school at Harbord Public School. She then continued her education at Mackellar Girls Campus & Freshwater Senior School, where she achieved huge sporting success in an array of sport codes. Football was the one to stick however as she continued her development at Manly United Football Club & Football NSW Institute before being picked up for Young Matilda's National Team duties.
Green's mother is a New Zealander which allowed her to be called up to play for New Zealand despite being born and living in Australia.

Honours
 Sydney FC
 W-League Championship: 2018-19
 W-League Premiership: 2020-21
 W-League Role Model Award: 2019–20
 PFA Young Player of the Year Nomination: 2019
 PFA Community Medal Nomination: 2020
 NPL Championship with Manly United: 2017 & 2020

References

External links
 Sydney FC player profile
 
 

1998 births
Living people
Australian women's soccer players
Australian people of New Zealand descent
Place of birth missing (living people)
Women's association football defenders
Sydney FC (A-League Women) players
Manly United FC players
Expatriate women's footballers in Norway
New Zealand expatriate sportspeople in Norway
New Zealand expatriate women's association footballers
Australian expatriate women's soccer players
Australian expatriate sportspeople in Norway
New Zealand women's association footballers
New Zealand women's international footballers
Vålerenga Fotball Damer players
AGF Fodbold (women) players
Soccer players from Sydney